Irina Petrovna Beletskaya (born 1933) is a Soviet and Russian professor of chemistry at Moscow State University. She specializes in organometallic chemistry and its application to problems in organic chemistry. She is best known for her studies on aromatic reaction mechanisms, as well as work on carbanion acidity and reactivity. She developed some of the first methods for carbon-carbon bond formation using palladium or nickel catalysts, and extended these reactions to work in aqueous media. She also helped to open up the chemistry of organolanthanides.

Academic career 
Beletskaya was born in Leningrad (St. Petersburg, Russia) in 1933. She graduated from the Department of Chemistry of Lomonosov Moscow State University in 1955. She obtained the Candidate of Chemistry (analogous to Ph.D) degree in 1958. In 1963 she received her Dr.Sci. degree from the same institution. In 1970 she became a Full Professor of Chemistry at Moscow State University, where she currently serves as head of the Organoelement Chemistry Laboratory. Beletskaya was elected a corresponding member of the Academy of Science of USSR in 1974. In 1992 she became a full member (academician) of the Russian Academy of Sciences. Between 1991-93 she served as president of the Division of Organic Chemistry of IUPAC. Until 2001 she served on the IUPAC Committee on Chemical Weapons Destruction Technology (CWDT). She is editor-in chief of the Russian Journal of Organic Chemistry.

Beletskaya initially researched on the reaction mechanisms. She, together with Prof. O. Reutov worked on electrophilic reactions at saturated carbon. She also investigated the reaction mechanisms of organometallic compounds. She also researched carbanion reactivity, with emphasis on reactivity and structure of ion pairs.

Honors and awards 
 Lomonosov Prize, 1974.
 Mendeleev Prize, 1979. 
 Nesmeyanov Prize, 1991. 
 Demidov Prize, 2003. 
 State Prize, 2004. 
 IUPAC 2013 Distinguished Women in Chemistry or Chemical Engineering Award, 2013.

References 

1933 births
Living people
20th-century Russian inventors
20th-century Russian women
Corresponding Members of the USSR Academy of Sciences
Full Members of the Russian Academy of Sciences
Academic staff of Moscow State University
Demidov Prize laureates
Honoured Scientists of the Russian Federation
Recipients of the Order of the Red Banner of Labour
State Prize of the Russian Federation laureates
Russian women chemists
Soviet women chemists
Women inventors